Mother Mary Catherine, Sacred White Buffalo (1867-1893) was a Roman Catholic nun and member of the Hunkpapa Lakota group. She founded the Congregation of American Sisters.

Early life 
Mother Mary Catherine was born in 1867 near the Standing Rock Indian Reservation in the Dakota Territory. Her English name was Josephine Crowfeather. Her father, Hunkpapa Lakota chief Joseph Crowfeather, reportedly carried Mother Mary Catherine into battle for safety when she was an infant; both father and daughter returned from the battle unharmed. Because of this, Crowfeather was given the name Ptesanwanyakapi (They See a White Buffalo Woman).

Education 
Crowfeather reportedly expressed a desire to become a Catholic nun at a young age, and spent four years at the Benedictine Sisters' School in Fort Yates, North Dakota. From 1888 to 1890, Crowfeather studied theology under Father Francis M. Craft. Both Crowfeather and Craft were reportedly influenced by the life and work of the Algonquin-Mohawk saint Kateri Tekakwitha.

Crowfeather later attended a Benedictine school in Avoca, Minnesota, along with five other Lakota women, and founded the Congregation of American Sisters.

References 

Hunkpapa people
Native American Roman Catholics
Benedictine nuns
19th-century Native American women
19th-century American Roman Catholic nuns
1867 births
1893 deaths